Altavilla, which when translated to English means "high place," may refer to:

Italy
Altavilla Irpina, municipality of the Province of Avellino 
Altavilla Milicia, municipality of the Province of Palermo 
Altavilla Monferrato, municipality of the Province of Alessandria 
Altavilla Silentina, municipality of the Province of Salerno 
Altavilla Vicentina, municipality of the Province of Vicenza

Switzerland
Altavilla, village of the municipality of Murten (Canton of Fribourg)

United States
Alta Villa, Arkansas

See also
Hauteville family (It.: Casa d'Altavilla), baronial Norman family settled also in Italy
Hauteville (disambiguation)